The Pistoia Mountains Astronomical Observatory (obs. code: 104), also known as the San Marcello Observatory and the Pian dei Termini Observatory, is an astronomical observatory in San Marcello Piteglio, Tuscany, central Italy.

The observatory uses a 0.4- and 0.6-meter Newton-Cassegrain telescope and is the home of the Gruppo Astrofili Montagna Pistoiese, a group of amateur astronomers known for its members Luciano Tesi (founder), Silvano Casulli, Paolo Bacci, Vasco Cecchini and late Vittorio Goretti.

List of discovered minor planets

See also 
 List of asteroid-discovering observatories
 List of astronomical observatories

References

External links 
 Gruppo Astrofili Montagna Pistoiese 
 A review of the observatory 
 An old page about the observatory 

Astronomical observatories in Italy
Buildings and structures in Tuscany

Minor-planet discovering observatories
San Marcello Piteglio